Orator Henry LaCraft (August 13, 1850 – July 25, 1940) was a member of the South Dakota Senate.

Biography
LaCraft was born on August 13, 1850 in Farmington, Washington County, Wisconsin. He was a direct descendant of pilgrims that journeyed to the continent on the Mayflower.

On April 16, 1873, LaCraft married Charlotte R. Haviland. They had two children before her death on July 17, 1883. LaCraft later married Clara M. Smith on February 25, 1885. They had five children.

Career
LaCraft was a member of the Senate from 1901 to 1904. Additionally, he was a justice of the peace, as well as Postmaster of Clark, South Dakota and a member of the Clark Board of Education. He was a Republican.

References

External links

People from Washington County, Wisconsin
People from Clark, South Dakota
Republican Party South Dakota state senators
South Dakota postmasters
School board members in South Dakota
American justices of the peace
1850 births
1940 deaths